Daqiao Township is a township under the administration of Dunhua City in southeastern Jilin province, China, located  east-southeast of downtown Dunhua. , it has 15 villages under its administration.

See also 
 List of township-level divisions of Jilin

References

External links 

Township-level divisions of Jilin
Dunhua